James Lynn Barnard (August 9, 1867 – 1941) was an American football coach and college faculty member. He served as the head football coach at Ursinus College in Collegeville, Pennsylvania in 1900, compiling a record of  4–6, while a member of the school's political science and history faculty.

He had previously been an instructor of political economy at Epworth Seminary in Epworth, Iowa and later worked in the Pennsylvania Department of Public Instruction in Harrisburg, Pennsylvania.

Head coaching record

References

External links
 

1867 births
1941 deaths
Syracuse University alumni
Ursinus Bears football coaches
Ursinus College faculty
Wharton School of the University of Pennsylvania alumni
People from Milford, New York